The buff-cheeked greenlet (Pachysylvia muscicapina) is a species of bird in the family Vireonidae.
It is found in Bolivia, Brazil, French Guiana, Guyana, Suriname, and Venezuela.
Its natural habitat is subtropical or tropical moist lowland forests.

References

buff-cheeked greenlet
Birds of the Amazon Basin
Birds of Brazil
Birds of the Guianas
buff-cheeked greenlet
buff-cheeked greenlet
buff-cheeked greenlet
Taxonomy articles created by Polbot